Saphenista lacteipalpis is a species of moth of the  family Tortricidae. It is found on St. Vincent in the West Indies.

References

Moths described in 1891
Saphenista